Cholecystokinin tetrapeptide (CCK-4, tetragastrin, Trp-Met-Asp-Phe-NH2) is a peptide fragment derived from the larger peptide hormone cholecystokinin. Unlike cholecystokin which has a variety of roles in the gastrointestinal system as well as central nervous system effects, CCK-4 acts primarily in the brain as an anxiogenic, although it does retain some GI effects, but not as much as CCK-8 or the full length polypeptide CCK-58.

CCK-4 reliably causes severe anxiety symptoms when administered to humans in a dose of as little as 50 μg,
and is commonly used in scientific research to induce panic attacks for the purpose of testing new anxiolytic drugs.
Since it is a peptide, CCK-4 must be administered by injection, and is rapidly broken down once inside the body so has only a short duration of action, although numerous synthetic analogues with modified properties are known.

See also 
 Pentagastrin

References 

Cholecystokinin agonists
Tetrapeptides
Anxiogenics
Thioethers